Brestovo is a village in the municipality of Stanari, Bosnia and Herzegovina. Until 2014, the settlement was located in the municipality of Doboj.

References

Villages in Republika Srpska
Populated places in Doboj